Praveen is an Indian actor known for his comic roles in Telugu films like Prema Katha Chitram, Sambho Siva Sambho, Rama Rama Krishna Krishna, Mirapakay, Kartikeya and Bhale Bhale Magadivoy and Sathamanam Bhavati.

Early life 
Praveen completed his schooling from AFDT high school and graduated by MVN JS & RVR 
College of Arts and Science, Malikipuram. He finished his post-graduation in M.Com.

Career
He made his debut as a comedian in the Telugu movie Kotha Bangaru Lokam (2008), directed by Srikanth Addala. The film stars Varun Sandesh, Shweta Prasad, Prakash Raj and Rao Ramesh. The movie won two Nandi Awards.

Praveen also played comic roles in Rowdy Fellow, Alludu Seenu, Mosagallaku Mosagadu, and Oopiri.

Filmography

References

External links
 
 

Living people
Male actors from Andhra Pradesh
Telugu comedians
Indian male film actors
21st-century Indian male actors
People from East Godavari district
Male actors in Telugu cinema
1984 births
Telugu male actors